HBIO may refer to:
Harvard Bioscience (NASDAQ: HBIO), is an American multinational company
H-Bio, an oil refinery process